The 1909 VFL season was the 13th season of the Victorian Football League (VFL), the highest level senior Australian rules football competition in Victoria. The season featured ten clubs, ran from 1 May until 2 October, and comprised an 18-game home-and-away season followed by a finals series featuring the top four clubs.

The premiership was won by the South Melbourne Football Club for the first time, after it defeated  by two points in the 1909 VFL Grand Final.

Premiership season
In 1909, the VFL competition consisted of ten teams of 18 on-the-field players each, with no reserves, although any of the 18 players who had left the playing field for any reason could later resume their place on the field at any time during the match.

Each team played each other twice in a home-and-away season of 18 rounds.

Once the 18 round home-and-away season had finished, the 1909 VFL premiers were determined by the specific format and conventions of the amended Argus system.

Round 1

|- bgcolor="#CCCCFF"
| Home team
| Home team score
| Away team
| Away team score
| Venue
| Date
|- bgcolor="#FFFFFF"
| 
| 6.8 (44)
| 
| 8.5 (53)
| Corio Oval
| 1 May 1909
|- bgcolor="#FFFFFF"
| 
| 6.18 (54)
| 
| 6.8 (44)
| EMCG
| 1 May 1909
|- bgcolor="#FFFFFF"
| 
| 9.7 (61)
| 
| 10.12 (72)
| Victoria Park
| 1 May 1909
|- bgcolor="#FFFFFF"
| 
| 3.14 (32)
| 
| 6.11 (47)
| Princes Park
| 1 May 1909
|- bgcolor="#FFFFFF"
| 
| 9.9 (63)
| 
| 11.8 (74)
| Punt Road Oval
| 1 May 1909

Round 2

|- bgcolor="#CCCCFF"
| Home team
| Home team score
| Away team
| Away team score
| Venue
| Date
|- bgcolor="#FFFFFF"
| 
| 12.16 (88)
| 
| 3.10 (28)
| Brunswick Street Oval
| 8 May 1909
|- bgcolor="#FFFFFF"
| 
| 5.7 (37)
| 
| 6.6 (42)
| EMCG
| 8 May 1909
|- bgcolor="#FFFFFF"
| 
| 7.5 (47)
| 
| 9.13 (67)
| MCG
| 8 May 1909
|- bgcolor="#FFFFFF"
| 
| 3.5 (23)
| 
| 3.11 (29)
| Junction Oval
| 8 May 1909
|- bgcolor="#FFFFFF"
| 
| 7.3 (45)
| 
| 4.4 (28)
| Lake Oval
| 8 May 1909

Round 3

|- bgcolor="#CCCCFF"
| Home team
| Home team score
| Away team
| Away team score
| Venue
| Date
|- bgcolor="#FFFFFF"
| 
| 5.12 (42)
| 
| 2.9 (21)
| Junction Oval
| 15 May 1909
|- bgcolor="#FFFFFF"
| 
| 8.18 (66)
| 
| 9.5 (59)
| EMCG
| 15 May 1909
|- bgcolor="#FFFFFF"
| 
| 7.8 (50)
| 
| 4.9 (33)
| Princes Park
| 15 May 1909
|- bgcolor="#FFFFFF"
| 
| 12.16 (88)
| 
| 3.6 (24)
| Lake Oval
| 15 May 1909
|- bgcolor="#FFFFFF"
| 
| 4.13 (37)
| 
| 9.14 (68)
| Punt Road Oval
| 15 May 1909

Round 4

|- bgcolor="#CCCCFF"
| Home team
| Home team score
| Away team
| Away team score
| Venue
| Date
|- bgcolor="#FFFFFF"
| 
| 6.15 (51)
| 
| 6.4 (40)
| MCG
| 22 May 1909
|- bgcolor="#FFFFFF"
| 
| 5.7 (37)
| 
| 11.10 (76)
| Brunswick Street Oval
| 22 May 1909
|- bgcolor="#FFFFFF"
| 
| 8.11 (59)
| 
| 9.14 (68)
| EMCG
| 22 May 1909
|- bgcolor="#FFFFFF"
| 
| 12.13 (85)
| 
| 7.7 (49)
| Victoria Park
| 22 May 1909
|- bgcolor="#FFFFFF"
| 
| 12.13 (85)
| 
| 8.13 (61)
| Corio Oval
| 22 May 1909

Round 5

|- bgcolor="#CCCCFF"
| Home team
| Home team score
| Away team
| Away team score
| Venue
| Date
|- bgcolor="#FFFFFF"
| 
| 7.8 (50)
| 
| 11.4 (70)
| Junction Oval
| 29 May 1909
|- bgcolor="#FFFFFF"
| 
| 9.9 (63)
| 
| 3.10 (28)
| EMCG
| 29 May 1909
|- bgcolor="#FFFFFF"
| 
| 5.7 (37)
| 
| 8.13 (61)
| Brunswick Street Oval
| 29 May 1909
|- bgcolor="#FFFFFF"
| 
| 6.10 (46)
| 
| 3.8 (26)
| Lake Oval
| 29 May 1909
|- bgcolor="#FFFFFF"
| 
| 8.9 (57)
| 
| 12.8 (80)
| MCG
| 29 May 1909

Round 6

|- bgcolor="#CCCCFF"
| Home team
| Home team score
| Away team
| Away team score
| Venue
| Date
|- bgcolor="#FFFFFF"
| 
| 10.11 (71)
| 
| 8.10 (58)
| Punt Road Oval
| 5 June 1909
|- bgcolor="#FFFFFF"
| 
| 6.12 (48)
| 
| 6.13 (49)
| Corio Oval
| 5 June 1909
|- bgcolor="#FFFFFF"
| 
| 10.13 (73)
| 
| 4.7 (31)
| Victoria Park
| 5 June 1909
|- bgcolor="#FFFFFF"
| 
| 6.12 (48)
| 
| 5.9 (39)
| Princes Park
| 5 June 1909
|- bgcolor="#FFFFFF"
| 
| 6.10 (46)
| 
| 9.11 (65)
| EMCG
| 5 June 1909

Round 7

|- bgcolor="#CCCCFF"
| Home team
| Home team score
| Away team
| Away team score
| Venue
| Date
|- bgcolor="#FFFFFF"
| 
| 9.8 (62)
| 
| 9.9 (63)
| EMCG
| 7 June 1909
|- bgcolor="#FFFFFF"
| 
| 8.17 (65)
| 
| 4.5 (29)
| Victoria Park
| 7 June 1909
|- bgcolor="#FFFFFF"
| 
| 10.12 (72)
| 
| 6.7 (43)
| Princes Park
| 7 June 1909
|- bgcolor="#FFFFFF"
| 
| 18.9 (117)
| 
| 5.8 (38)
| MCG
| 7 June 1909
|- bgcolor="#FFFFFF"
| 
| 4.11 (35)
| 
| 11.10 (76)
| Junction Oval
| 7 June 1909

Round 8

|- bgcolor="#CCCCFF"
| Home team
| Home team score
| Away team
| Away team score
| Venue
| Date
|- bgcolor="#FFFFFF"
| 
| 11.15 (81)
| 
| 2.6 (18)
| Lake Oval
| 12 June 1909
|- bgcolor="#FFFFFF"
| 
| 5.12 (42)
| 
| 8.7 (55)
| Brunswick Street Oval
| 12 June 1909
|- bgcolor="#FFFFFF"
| 
| 8.7 (55)
| 
| 8.15 (63)
| EMCG
| 12 June 1909
|- bgcolor="#FFFFFF"
| 
| 5.10 (40)
| 
| 10.8 (68)
| Corio Oval
| 12 June 1909
|- bgcolor="#FFFFFF"
| 
| 5.10 (40)
| 
| 10.9 (69)
| Junction Oval
| 12 June 1909

Round 9

|- bgcolor="#CCCCFF"
| Home team
| Home team score
| Away team
| Away team score
| Venue
| Date
|- bgcolor="#FFFFFF"
| 
| 6.14 (50)
| 
| 4.9 (33)
| Princes Park
| 19 June 1909
|- bgcolor="#FFFFFF"
| 
| 14.13 (97)
| 
| 2.8 (20)
| Lake Oval
| 19 June 1909
|- bgcolor="#FFFFFF"
| 
| 4.15 (39)
| 
| 5.7 (37)
| Punt Road Oval
| 19 June 1909
|- bgcolor="#FFFFFF"
| 
| 8.20 (68)
| 
| 3.10 (28)
| EMCG
| 26 June 1909
|- bgcolor="#FFFFFF"
| 
| 10.5 (65)
| 
| 10.5 (65)
| MCG
| 26 June 1909

Round 10

|- bgcolor="#CCCCFF"
| Home team
| Home team score
| Away team
| Away team score
| Venue
| Date
|- bgcolor="#FFFFFF"
| 
| 12.10 (82)
| 
| 2.3 (15)
| MCG
| 3 July 1909
|- bgcolor="#FFFFFF"
| 
| 17.9 (111)
| 
| 4.7 (31)
| Lake Oval
| 3 July 1909
|- bgcolor="#FFFFFF"
| 
| 6.6 (42)
| 
| 9.18 (72)
| Junction Oval
| 3 July 1909
|- bgcolor="#FFFFFF"
| 
| 2.9 (21)
| 
| 6.16 (52)
| Brunswick Street Oval
| 3 July 1909
|- bgcolor="#FFFFFF"
| 
| 7.7 (49)
| 
| 10.9 (69)
| EMCG
| 3 July 1909

Round 11

|- bgcolor="#CCCCFF"
| Home team
| Home team score
| Away team
| Away team score
| Venue
| Date
|- bgcolor="#FFFFFF"
| 
| 7.8 (50)
| 
| 11.15 (81)
| Punt Road Oval
| 10 July 1909
|- bgcolor="#FFFFFF"
| 
| 5.10 (40)
| 
| 3.12 (30)
| EMCG
| 10 July 1909
|- bgcolor="#FFFFFF"
| 
| 11.18 (84)
| 
| 6.8 (44)
| Victoria Park
| 10 July 1909
|- bgcolor="#FFFFFF"
| 
| 9.14 (68)
| 
| 6.8 (44)
| Princes Park
| 10 July 1909
|- bgcolor="#FFFFFF"
| 
| 9.7 (61)
| 
| 13.9 (87)
| Corio Oval
| 10 July 1909

Round 12

|- bgcolor="#CCCCFF"
| Home team
| Home team score
| Away team
| Away team score
| Venue
| Date
|- bgcolor="#FFFFFF"
| 
| 3.6 (24)
| 
| 6.9 (45)
| MCG
| 17 July 1909
|- bgcolor="#FFFFFF"
| 
| 9.14 (68)
| 
| 3.7 (25)
| Brunswick Street Oval
| 17 July 1909
|- bgcolor="#FFFFFF"
| 
| 11.14 (80)
| 
| 4.2 (26)
| EMCG
| 17 July 1909
|- bgcolor="#FFFFFF"
| 
| 6.9 (45)
| 
| 12.8 (80)
| Corio Oval
| 17 July 1909
|- bgcolor="#FFFFFF"
| 
| 5.7 (37)
| 
| 5.6 (36)
| Victoria Park
| 17 July 1909

Round 13

|- bgcolor="#CCCCFF"
| Home team
| Home team score
| Away team
| Away team score
| Venue
| Date
|- bgcolor="#FFFFFF"
| 
| 19.16 (130)
| 
| 10.10 (70)
| Princes Park
| 24 July 1909
|- bgcolor="#FFFFFF"
| 
| 5.11 (41)
| 
| 12.7 (79)
| Junction Oval
| 24 July 1909
|- bgcolor="#FFFFFF"
| 
| 4.6 (30)
| 
| 5.14 (44)
| Lake Oval
| 24 July 1909
|- bgcolor="#FFFFFF"
| 
| 4.19 (43)
| 
| 11.9 (75)
| EMCG
| 24 July 1909
|- bgcolor="#FFFFFF"
| 
| 5.7 (37)
| 
| 8.24 (72)
| Punt Road Oval
| 24 July 1909

Round 14

|- bgcolor="#CCCCFF"
| Home team
| Home team score
| Away team
| Away team score
| Venue
| Date
|- bgcolor="#FFFFFF"
| 
| 9.11 (65)
| 
| 6.13 (49)
| Punt Road Oval
| 31 July 1909
|- bgcolor="#FFFFFF"
| 
| 6.11 (47)
| 
| 12.15 (87)
| Corio Oval
| 31 July 1909
|- bgcolor="#FFFFFF"
| 
| 10.9 (69)
| 
| 7.7 (49)
| EMCG
| 31 July 1909
|- bgcolor="#FFFFFF"
| 
| 8.6 (54)
| 
| 6.7 (43)
| Victoria Park
| 31 July 1909
|- bgcolor="#FFFFFF"
| 
| 10.21 (81)
| 
| 4.6 (30)
| Princes Park
| 31 July 1909

Round 15

|- bgcolor="#CCCCFF"
| Home team
| Home team score
| Away team
| Away team score
| Venue
| Date
|- bgcolor="#FFFFFF"
| 
| 3.8 (26)
| 
| 2.10 (22)
| Junction Oval
| 7 August 1909
|- bgcolor="#FFFFFF"
| 
| 14.14 (98)
| 
| 6.6 (42)
| EMCG
| 7 August 1909
|- bgcolor="#FFFFFF"
| 
| 4.4 (28)
| 
| 2.15 (27)
| MCG
| 14 August 1909
|- bgcolor="#FFFFFF"
| 
| 18.11 (119)
| 
| 3.8 (26)
| Lake Oval
| 14 August 1909
|- bgcolor="#FFFFFF"
| 
| 2.9 (21)
| 
| 11.6 (72)
| Brunswick Street Oval
| 14 August 1909

Round 16

|- bgcolor="#CCCCFF"
| Home team
| Home team score
| Away team
| Away team score
| Venue
| Date
|- bgcolor="#FFFFFF"
| 
| 6.9 (45)
| 
| 9.14 (68)
| Corio Oval
| 21 August 1909
|- bgcolor="#FFFFFF"
| 
| 11.11 (77)
| 
| 5.1 (31)
| Brunswick Street Oval
| 21 August 1909
|- bgcolor="#FFFFFF"
| 
| 6.5 (41)
| 
| 5.7 (37)
| Lake Oval
| 21 August 1909
|- bgcolor="#FFFFFF"
| 
| 5.9 (39)
| 
| 5.9 (39)
| EMCG
| 21 August 1909
|- bgcolor="#FFFFFF"
| 
| 9.6 (60)
| 
| 14.16 (100)
| Punt Road Oval
| 21 August 1909

Round 17

|- bgcolor="#CCCCFF"
| Home team
| Home team score
| Away team
| Away team score
| Venue
| Date
|- bgcolor="#FFFFFF"
| 
| 11.11 (77)
| 
| 4.8 (32)
| Victoria Park
| 28 August 1909
|- bgcolor="#FFFFFF"
| 
| 11.13 (79)
| 
| 5.3 (33)
| Princes Park
| 28 August 1909
|- bgcolor="#FFFFFF"
| 
| 5.9 (39)
| 
| 9.11 (65)
| EMCG
| 28 August 1909
|- bgcolor="#FFFFFF"
| 
| 9.7 (61)
| 
| 4.7 (31)
| MCG
| 28 August 1909
|- bgcolor="#FFFFFF"
| 
| 5.9 (39)
| 
| 12.11 (83)
| Punt Road Oval
| 28 August 1909

Round 18

|- bgcolor="#CCCCFF"
| Home team
| Home team score
| Away team
| Away team score
| Ground
| Date
|- bgcolor="#FFFFFF"
| 
| 5.5 (35)
| 
| 7.15 (57)
| Junction Oval
| 4 September 1909
|- bgcolor="#FFFFFF"
| 
| 13.14 (92)
| 
| 4.7 (31)
| Corio Oval
| 4 September 1909
|- bgcolor="#FFFFFF"
| 
| 9.6 (60)
| 
| 8.12 (60)
| Brunswick Street Oval
| 4 September 1909
|- bgcolor="#FFFFFF"
| 
| 15.18 (108)
| 
| 9.12 (66)
| Victoria Park
| 4 September 1909
|- bgcolor="#FFFFFF"
| 
| 4.10 (34)
| 
| 6.13 (49)
| EMCG
| 4 September 1909

Ladder

Finals

All of the 1909 finals were played at the MCG so the home team in the semi-finals and Preliminary Final is purely the higher ranked team from the ladder but in the Grand Final the home team was the team that won the Preliminary Final.

Semi-finals

|- bgcolor="#CCCCFF"
| Home team
| Score
| Away team
| Score
| Venue
| Date
|- bgcolor="#FFFFFF"
| Carlton
| 14.8 (92)
| Essendon
| 9.2 (56)
| MCG
| 11 September
|- bgcolor="#FFFFFF"
| South Melbourne
| 10.8 (68)| Collingwood
| 6.11 (47)
| MCG
| 18 September

Preliminary final

|- bgcolor="#CCCCFF"
| Home team| Score| Away team| Score| Venue| Date|- bgcolor="#FFFFFF"
| South Melbourne
| 7.5 (47)
| Carlton| 10.9 (69)| MCG
| 25 September

Grand final

This was South Melbourne's first VFL premiership after finishing runner-up in 1899 and 1907.

|- bgcolor="#CCCCFF"
| Home team| Score| Away team| Score| Venue| Date|- bgcolor="#FFFFFF"
| Carlton
| 4.12 (36)
| South Melbourne| 4.14 (38)'| MCG
| 2 October

Awards
 The 1909 VFL Premiership team was South Melbourne.
 The VFL's leading goalkicker was Dick Lee of Collingwood with 58 goals.
 St Kilda took the wooden spoon in 1909.

Notable events
 In the second-round match against the University Football Club, badly concussed Richmond follower Bill Burns, who was about to leave for hospital, heard that Richmond was about to lose the match, returned to the field of play, took a mark, kicked the winning goal, and was carried off the ground on his teammates' shoulders. Later in 1909, Burns was suspended for life after being found guilty of a kicking charge; however, the sentence was later reduced on appeal.
 On 19 May 1909, the VFL Permit Committee considered the extraordinary application for a clearance to Carlton by South Melbourne footballer Bill Goddard. Although Goddard had played in all of South Melbourne's pre-season matches, South Melbourne readily agreed to clear him on the grounds that "he will not be selected in our team as we do not considered him good enough as a player". The application was made independently by Goddard, and unsolicited by Carlton, because Goddard "had seen a couple of the Carlton players who told him that he could get a game" and "[having seen] one of the committee, had decided to apply for a clearance". However, Carlton's secretary, Jack Worrall, informed the Committee that "This application has been made without the consent of my committee, and I further wish to state the committee do not desire the services of Mr. Goddard". The Permit Committee refused Goddard's application.
(Goddard transferred to Carlton in 1910, playing 13 senior games with Carlton, before transferring to St Kilda in 1911.)
In Round 6, St Kilda defeated Geelong on the field by one point, but the game was awarded to Geelong on protest after it was established that Billy Stewart, who played for St Kilda in that match, was under suspension for a striking in match in Bendigo the previous week. St Kilda had been aware that Stewart was suspended, but its defence against playing him was procedural: that although Stewart's suspension had been handed down on 3 June, it had not been formally communicated to the VFL until 6 June, one day after the match; but the League found that the suspension was valid for the dates specified by the Bendigo Football Association, and it did not need to have been communicated to the League for it to reciprocally valid. This is the only such forfeiture to have lasted in senior VFL/AFL history (other such forfeits have temporarily occurred in the seniors, but were later reversed on appeal).
 In Round 7 against Geelong, Harry Brereton of Melbourne, in only his seventh game, became the first player to kick nine or more goals in a match since Jim McShane in 1899.
 A Round 8 match between Fitzroy and Melbourne was marred by numerous incidents of foul play. Spectators were involved in a large brawl at the end of the game.
 The Round 13 match between Carlton and Geelong saw the teams score an aggregate of 29.26 (200), the highest in VFL history to that time.
 There were riots in the crowd after the Round 13 match between South Melbourne and Fitzroy.
 An imminent on-field brawl between players from Collingwood and South Melbourne in their Round 14 match was averted when the appearance of a policeman on the ground calmed both teams down.
 The Round 15 match between St Kilda and Geelong is the last VFL/AFL game as of 2017 in which no goals were scored in the second half. On a flooded Junction Oval, St Kilda kicked 0.7 to Geelong's 0.5 after half time.
University's draw with Collingwood in Round 16 was the closest that the Students got to defeating the Magpies in a League match.
 A Collingwood spectator jumped the fence at the Round 18 match against Melbourne and punched a Melbourne player. Melbourne's Secretary, Mr. J.A. Harper, ran onto the field and made a citizens' arrest.
 The Argus newspaper published the height, weight and occupation of each player in the finals for the first time.

See also
 1909 VFL Grand Final

Footnotes

References
 Hogan, P., The Tigers Of Old, The Richmond Football Club, (Richmond), 1996. 
 Maplestone, M., Flying Higher: History of the Essendon Football Club 1872–1996, Essendon Football Club, (Melbourne), 1996. 
 Rogers, S. & Brown, A., Every Game Ever Played: VFL/AFL Results 1897–1997 (Sixth Edition), Viking Books, (Ringwood), 1998. 
 Ross, J. (ed), 100 Years of Australian Football 1897–1996: The Complete Story of the AFL, All the Big Stories, All the Great Pictures, All the Champions, Every AFL Season Reported'', Viking, (Ringwood), 1996.

External links
 1909 Season – AFL Tables

Australian Football League seasons
VFL season